Steven Joseph Wojciechowski (born July 29, 1970) is an American former professional baseball player. A left-handed pitcher, he played parts of three seasons in Major League Baseball (MLB) for the Oakland Athletics in 1995–1997. Wojciechowski grew up in Calumet City, IL with three sisters and a brother. He attended TF North High School there. Steve attended Saint Xavier University and was drafted by the Oakland Athletics in the 4th round of the 1991 MLB draft.

He now resides in East Grand Rapids, Michigan with his wife, Stacey Elmquist-Wojciechowski.

He teaches Geography and World History at East Grand Rapids Middle School. He also, is the pitching coach for the Aquinas Saints a NAIA baseball team in the WHAC conference.

References

1970 births
Living people
American expatriate baseball players in Canada
American people of Polish descent
Baseball coaches from Illinois
Baseball players from Illinois
Calgary Cannons players
Edmonton Trappers players
Fresno Grizzlies players
Gulf Coast Twins players
High school baseball coaches in the United States
Huntsville Stars players
Major League Baseball pitchers
Modesto A's players
Oakland Athletics players
People from Blue Island, Illinois
Saint Xavier Cougars baseball players
Salt Lake Buzz players
Sonoma County Crushers players
Southern Oregon A's players
Sportspeople from the Chicago metropolitan area